The Darwin Triple Crown (formally known as the Betr Darwin Triple Crown) is an annual motor racing event for Supercars, held at Hidden Valley Raceway in Darwin, Northern Territory. The event has been a regular part of the Supercars Championship—and its previous incarnations, the Australian Touring Car Championship, Shell Championship Series and V8 Supercars Championship—since 1998.

Format
The event is held over three days, from Friday to Sunday. On Friday, two practice sessions are held. On Saturday, a three-part knock-out qualifying session is then held, determining the grid for the 100 kilometre race to follow. Sunday features two ten-minute qualifying sessions that set the grid for each of the day's two 100 km races.

The event has been known as the Triple Crown since 2006, which originally referred to the three races in the weekend format of the time. Currently, the title refers to the two races during the event and the top ten shootout. The Triple Crown remained elusive until Scott McLaughlin was fastest in the top ten shootout and won both races in 2019. From 2020, the Triple Crown trophy was awarded to the driver that scored the most points across the weekend.

History

Hidden Valley Raceway had existed for several years prior to being upgraded for its first national championship event in 1998, a round of the Australian Touring Car Championship (ATCC). Mark Skaife had been on course to take victory in the opening race when an engine issue on the final lap allowed teammate Craig Lowndes past, with Skaife finishing 2nd. Lowndes' car then failed to fire prior to the start of the second race and both he and Skaife failed to make the grid, leaving the front row empty. Russell Ingall, who had a stop-go penalty in the first race for spinning Jason Bright, charged from 13th on the grid to take victory and went on to win the inaugural round with another win in race three of the weekend. In 1999, Bright took his first career round win in what was Ford's only round win of the year. It was also the first round win for Stone Brothers Racing, who saw further success at the event in 2001 when Marcos Ambrose scored his first round win, despite not winning a race over the weekend.

In 2004, Ambrose made contact while attempting to overtake Skaife for the lead on the final corner of the race, delaying both and granting victory to Ambrose's teammate Ingall. In the following race, Ambrose then spun Ingall off on the first corner of the race. Todd Kelly went on to win the round, his first of two consecutive event wins. Michael Caruso took his first Supercars race win at the event in 2009, holding off a late charge from Alex Davison. At a late safety car restart in the first race of the 2011 event, the top four tangled into turn one, allowing fifth-placed Rick Kelly to take the race win. In 2013 Jonathon Webb, driving for his family team Tekno Autosports, won his first career round. At the 2015 event, Lowndes became the first to achieve 100 race wins in ATCC and Supercars, capitalising on a collision between Rick Kelly and Fabian Coulthard on the opening lap. In 2016, Caruso provided Nissan with their first round victory since 1992. At the same event, Lee Holdsworth suffered a broken pelvis in a first lap accident, forcing him out of the next three events.

From 2017 to 2019, Scott McLaughlin became the first driver to win three consecutive events in Darwin. Most notably, this included McLaughlin becoming the first driver to win the Triple Crown in 2019, qualifying fastest in the top ten shootout (albeit only by a margin of under two hundredths of a second) and winning both races for DJR Team Penske. The Triple Crown was again awarded in 2020 but only due to a change in criteria which saw the trophy guaranteed to be awarded to the round winner. Jamie Whincup tied for points with Fabian Coulthard but won the trophy on countback, meanwhile Anton de Pasquale won his first championship race in the first race of the weekend. In addition to the Triple Crown, Hidden Valley hosted a second event in consecutive weeks, known as the Darwin SuperSprint, as part of the calendar changes caused by the COVID-19 pandemic. In 2021, it was announced the event would become the championship's Indigenous Round, with some teams running special liveries for the event. Over the weekend, the event also incorporated Superbikes and drag racing with Supercars, for the first time since the Winfield Triple Challenge events at Sydney Motorsport Park in the early 1990s.

Winners

Notes
  – Hidden Valley Raceway hosted two events of the 2020 Supercars Championship, Rounds 5 and 6, in consecutive weekends.

Multiple winners

By driver

By team

By manufacturer

Notes
  – Walkinshaw Andretti United was known as Holden Racing Team from 1990 to 2016, hence their statistics are combined.
  – Dick Johnson Racing was known as DJR Team Penske from 2015 to 2020, hence their statistics are combined.
  – Prodrive Racing Australia was known as Ford Performance Racing from 2003 to 2014, hence their statistics are combined.

Event names and sponsors
 1998–2004: Hidden Valley
 2005: Skycity V8 Supercars
 2006–15: Skycity Triple Crown
 2016–18: CrownBet Darwin Triple Crown
 2019–20: BetEasy Darwin Triple Crown
 2020: CoreStaff Darwin SuperSprint
 2021–22: Merlin Darwin Triple Crown
 2023–: Betr Darwin Triple Crown

See also
 List of Australian Touring Car Championship races

References

Supercars Championship races
Recurring sporting events established in 1998
Sport in Darwin, Northern Territory
Motorsport in the Northern Territory
1998 establishments in Australia